Retrograde is the third studio album by American metalcore band Crown the Empire. It was released on July 22, 2016, through Rise Records and was produced by Drew Fulk. The album debuted at number 15 on the Billboard 200. This is the first album the band released without lead guitarist Benn Suede, as well as the last album before co-lead vocalist Dave Escamilla left the band in January 2017.

Track listing

Personnel
Credits adapted from AllMusic.

Crown the Empire
 Andrew "Andy Leo" Rockhold – lead vocals, keyboards, programming
 Dave Escamilla – co-lead vocals, rhythm guitar
 Brandon Hoover – lead guitar, backing vocals
 Hayden Tree – bass, backing vocals
 Brent Taddie – drums, percussion

Additional personnel
 Drew Fulk – production, engineering, mixing, composition
 Josh Strock – engineering, composition
 Chris Athens – mastering
 Chris Baseford – drum engineering
 Jeff Dunne – drum editing, mixing assistance
 Brendan Barone – creative consultant, composition
 Stevie Aiello – composition
 Sean Heydorn – A&R

Charts

References 

2016 albums
Rise Records albums
Crown the Empire albums